Dermatonotus is a genus of frogs in the family Microhylidae. It is monotypic, being represented by the single species, Dermatonotus muelleri,  commonly known as Muller's termite frog. It is found in Argentina, Bolivia, Brazil, and Paraguay.

Females are larger than males. It lives below ground, feeding on termites. It is an explosive breeder.

Dermatonotus muelleri is locally abundant, but it is threatened by habitat loss in parts of its range. It is sometimes collected for international pet trade.

References

Microhylidae
Monotypic amphibian genera
Amphibians described in 1885
Amphibians of Argentina
Amphibians of Bolivia
Amphibians of Brazil
Amphibians of Paraguay
Taxa named by Oskar Boettger
Taxonomy articles created by Polbot